Dé (Fulfulde: De:; Tommo So: Dɛ̌:) is a village and seat of the commune of Diamnati in the Cercle of Bandiagara of the Mopti Region of southern-central Mali.

Although Fulfulde is the primary language of Dé, the residents have Dogon names. Tommo So is also spoken by some residents.

References

Populated places in Mopti Region